The Statistical Institute of Catalonia (in Catalan: Institut d'Estadística de Catalunya, usually referred to by its acronym IDESCAT) is the official body responsible for collecting and publishing statistics in the autonomous community of Catalonia, Spain. The institute comes under the Department of the Economy and Finances of the Generalitat de Catalunya (Government of Catalonia).

Its offices are on Via Laietana, Barcelona.

External links

Organisations based in Catalonia